Brooke Kazuko Elby (born May 24, 1993) is the executive director of the National Women's Soccer League Players Association. An American former soccer midfielder/defender who last played for the Chicago Red Stars  in the National Women's Soccer League (NWSL).

Club career
She previously played for the Boston Breakers and Melbourne Victory of the Australian W-League. Elby was a member of the Boston Breakers when they folded in January, 2018. She was selected by the Utah Royals FC in the Boston Breakers Dispersal Draft. On June 18, 2018, Elby was traded to the Chicago Red Stars. On December 16, 2019, Elby announced her retirement from professional soccer.

NWSL Players Association
In 2019, Elby was elected president of the National Women's Soccer League Players Association (NWSLPA), succeeding Yael Averbuch. Following her retirement from professional soccer, Elby will assume the role of co-executive director at the NWSLPA.

References

External links
 Boston Breakers player profile
 North Carolina player profile
 

1995 births
Living people
Melbourne Victory FC (A-League Women) players
A-League Women players
North Carolina Tar Heels women's soccer players
Boston Breakers players
National Women's Soccer League players
Utah Royals FC players
American women's soccer players
Soccer players from California
Sportspeople from Los Angeles County, California
People from Arcadia, California
Women's association football midfielders
Women's association football defenders
Chicago Red Stars players